This is a list of award winners and league leaders for the Minnesota Twins professional baseball team.

Award winners

Most Valuable Player (AL)
 – Walter Johnson
1924 – Walter Johnson
1925 – Roger Peckinpaugh
1965 – Zoilo Versalles
1969 – Harmon Killebrew
1977 – Rod Carew
2006 – Justin Morneau
 – Joe Mauer

Cy Young (AL)
 – Jim Perry
1988 – Frank Viola
2004 – Johan Santana
 – Johan Santana

Rookie of the Year (AL)
 – Albie Pearson
1959 – Bob Allison
1964 – Tony Oliva
1967 – Rod Carew
1979 – John Castino (shared with Alfredo Griffin)
1991 – Chuck Knoblauch
 – Marty Cordova

Manager of the Year (AL)
1991 – Tom Kelly
2010 – Ron Gardenhire
2017 – Paul Molitor
2019 - Rocco Baldelli

Gold Glove Award (AL)

Pitcher
Jim Kaat [12] (1962–72, Twins, 1973 Twins-White Sox)
Johan Santana (2007)

Catcher
Earl Battey [3] (1960–62)
Joe Mauer (2008–2010)

First base
Vic Power [3] (1962-63 Twins, 1964 Twins-Angels)
Doug Mientkiewicz (2001)

Second base
Brian Dozier (2017)
Chuck Knoblauch (1997)

Third base
Gary Gaetti [4] (1986–89)

Shortstop
Zoilo Versalles [2] (1963, 1965)

Outfield
Byron Buxton (2017)
Torii Hunter [7] (2001–2007)
Kirby Puckett [6] (1986–89, 1991–92)
Tony Oliva (1966)

Wilson Defensive Player of the Year Award

Team (at all positions)

 (2012)
 (2013)

Silver Slugger (AL)

DH
Paul Molitor (1996)
Nelson Cruz (2019)
Catcher
Joe Mauer [4] (2006–2010)
Mitch Garver (2019)

First baseman
Justin Morneau [2] (2006, 2008)

Second baseman
Chuck Knoblauch [2] (1995,1997)

Third baseman
none

Shortstop
none

Outfielders
Kirby Puckett [6] (1986–89, 1992, 1994)
Josh Willingham (2012)

Utility player
Luis Arráez (2022)

Edgar Martínez Award
Chili Davis (1991)
Paul Molitor (1996)
Nelson Cruz (2019)

Roberto Clemente Award
Rod Carew (1977)
Dave Winfield (1994)
Kirby Puckett (1996)
Nelson Cruz (2021)

Major League Triple Crown: Pitching

Johan Santana (2006)

Triple Crown (AL): Pitching

Johan Santana (2006)

DHL Hometown Heroes (2006)
DHL Hometown Heroes:
Kirby Puckett — voted by MLB fans as the most outstanding player in the history of the franchise, based on on-field performance, leadership quality and character value

All-Star Game MVP Award
Major League Baseball All-Star Game MVP Award
Kirby Puckett (1993)

All-Stars
Major League Baseball All-Star Game:

Catcher
Earl Battey [4] (1962, 63, 65, 66)
Joe Mauer [4] (2006, 08, 09, 10)
Butch Wynegar [2] (1976, 77)
Dave Engle (1984)
Tim Laudner (1988)
A. J. Pierzynski (2002)
John Roseboro (1969)
Kurt Suzuki (2014)

First Baseman
Justin Morneau [4] (2007–10)
Rod Carew [3] (1976–78)
Harmon Killebrew [3] (1967–69)
Bob Allison (1963)
Ron Coomer (1999)
Kent Hrbek (1982)

Second Baseman
Rod Carew [9] (1967–75)
Chuck Knoblauch [4] (1992, 94, 96, 97)
Brian Dozier (2015)

Third Baseman
Harmon Killebrew [5] (1961, 65, 66, 70, 71)
Gary Gaetti [2] (1988, 89)
Rich Rollins (1962)

Shortstop
Zoilo Versalles [2] (1963, 65)
Leo Cárdenas (1971)
Cristian Guzmán (2001)
Roy Smalley (1979)
Eduardo Nunez (2016)
Jorge Polanco (2019)

Outfield
Kirby Puckett [10] (1986–95)
Tony Oliva [8] (1964–71)
Jimmie Hall [2] (1964, 65)
Torii Hunter [2] (2002, 07)
Bob Allison (1964)
Tom Brunansky (1985)
Larry Hisle (1977)
Harmon Killebrew (1963)
Ken Landreaux (1980)
Matt Lawton (2000)
Gary Ward (1983)
Michael Cuddyer (2011)

Designated Hitter
Nelson Cruz (2021)

Pitcher
Camilo Pascual [3] (1961–62, 64)
Joe Nathan [4] (2004, 05, 08, 09)
Rick Aguilera [3] (1991–93)
Johan Santana [3] (2005–07)
Glen Perkins [3] (2013, 14, 15)
Eddie Guardado [2] (2002, 03)
Jim Kaat [2] (1962, 66)
Jim Perry [2] (1970, 71)
José Berríos [2] (2018, 2019)
Bert Blyleven (1973)
Dean Chance (1967)
Doug Corbett (1981)
Mudcat Grant (1965)
Francisco Liriano (2006)
Joe Mays (2001)
Eric Milton (2001)
Jack Morris (1991)
Brad Radke (1998)
Jeff Reardon (1988)
Frank Viola (1988)
Jake Odorizzi (2019)

Sports Illustrated MLB All-Decade Team (2009)

Joe Mauer, catcher
David Ortiz, designated hitter (Twins–Red Sox)
Johan Santana, starting pitcher (Twins–Mets)

Baseball America Major League Player of the Year

Joe Mauer

Baseball America Manager of the Year

Ron Gardenhire

Chuck Tanner Major League Baseball Manager of the Year Award

Ron Gardenhire

Other achievements

Baseball Hall of Famers

Ford C. Frick Award recipients

Twins Hall of Fame

Retired numbers

BBWAA chapter awards

Team award
 – American League pennant (as Washington Senators)
 – World Series championship (as Washington Senators)
 – American League pennant (as Washington Senators)
 – American League pennant (as Washington Senators)
 – American League pennant (as Minnesota Twins)
1987 – William Harridge Trophy (American League champion)
 – Commissioner's Trophy (World Series)
1991 – William Harridge Trophy (American League champion)
 – Commissioner's Trophy (World Series)
 – Baseball America Organization of the Year
 – Baseball America Organization of the Year

Team records

League leaders

Batting

Home Runs
1969 – Harmon Killebrew (49)
1967 – Harmon Killebrew (44)
1964 – Harmon Killebrew (49)
1963 – Harmon Killebrew (45)
1962 – Harmon Killebrew (48)

Runs Batted In
1994 – Kirby Puckett (112)
1977 – Larry Hisle (119)
1971 – Harmon Killebrew (119)
1969 – Harmon Killebrew (140)
1962 – Harmon Killebrew (126)

Batting average
2009 – Joe Mauer (.365)*
2008 – Joe Mauer (.328)
2006 – Joe Mauer (.347)**
1989 – Kirby Puckett (.339)
1978 – Rod Carew (.333)
1977 – Rod Carew (.388)
1975 – Rod Carew (.359)
1974 – Rod Carew (.364)
1973 – Rod Carew (.350)
1972 – Rod Carew (.318)
1971 – Tony Oliva (.337)
1969 – Rod Carew (.332)
1965 – Tony Oliva (.321)
1964 – Tony Oliva (.323)

 * Highest batting average for a catcher in MLB History
 ** First AL catcher to win batting title

Pitching

Wins
2006 – Johan Santana (19)*
1991 – Scott Erickson (20)*
1988 – Frank Viola (24)
1977 – Dave Goltz (20)*
1970 – Jim Perry (24)*
1966 – Jim Kaat (25)
1965 – Mudcat Grant (21)
 * Tied for league lead

ERA
2006 – Johan Santana (2.77)
2004 – Johan Santana (2.61)
1988 – Allan Anderson (2.45)

Strikeouts
2006 – Johan Santana (245)
2005 – Johan Santana (238)
2004 – Johan Santana (265)
1985 – Bert Blyleven (206)*
1963 – Camilo Pascual (202)
1962 – Camilo Pascual (206)
1961 – Camilo Pascual (221)

 ''* Includes statistics while with Cleveland Indians

Saves
2002 – Eddie Guardado (45)
1979 – Mike Marshall (32)
1970 – Ron Perranoski (34)
1969 – Ron Perranoski (31)
1968 – Al Worthington (18)

See also
Baseball awards
List of MLB awards

Notes

References

Awa
Major League Baseball team trophies and awards